Roxanne may refer to:
Roxanne (given name)
Hurricane Roxanne, a major hurricane in October 1995

Music 

"Roxanne" (The Police song), a 1978 song by The Police
"Roxanne" (Arizona Zervas song), a 2019 song by Arizona Zervas
"Roxanne", a 1978 song by Golden Earring from Grab It for a Second
Roxanne (band), a band active in the late 1980s

Films 

Roxanne (film), a 1987 movie adaptation of the play Cyrano De Bergerac with Steve Martin and Daryl Hannah
Roxanne Roxanne, a 2017 American film

Other 

Roxanne (Pokémon), a character in the Pokémon universe
Roxanne (model),  the assistant on the 1950-1961 game show Beat the Clock

See also

Roxane (disambiguation)
Roxan (protein), a protein that in humans is encoded by the ZC3H7B gene
Roxann
Roxana, one of Alexander the Great's wives
Roxelana, one of Suleiman the Magnificent's wives
Roshanak, the usual Western spelling of the Persian feminine name 
Roxanne Wars, a series of hip-hop rivalries in the 1980s
Roxy (disambiguation)